Dyadin is a rural locality (a khutor) in Radchenskoye Rural Settlement, Bogucharsky District, Voronezh Oblast, Russia. The population was 333 as of 2010. There are 8 streets.

Geography 
Dyadin is located on the Levaya Bogucharka River, 17 km south of Boguchar (the district's administrative centre) by road. Radchenskoye is the nearest rural locality.

References 

Rural localities in Bogucharsky District